Johann Melchior Gletle (July 1626 – 6 September 1683) was a Swiss organist, Kapellmeister and composer.

Life
Gletle was born in Bremgarten. He was a prolific composer of church music - masses, psalms, motets, and also several pieces for the tromba marina. He died, aged 57, in Augsburg.

Works, editions and recordings

Works
 Motetta Sacra concertata, Op. 1 (1667)
 36 Trompeter-Stückle (1675), edited by Christian Blümel (Leverkusen: Mark Tezak, 1985)
 Beatus Vir (Psalm 111) (1676/1677) (Ammerbuch: C. Hofius, 2010)
 Expeditio musicae, classis IV, Op. 5 (1677)
 Cantate Domino, motet for soprano, tenor, 2 violins, 2 violas, Cello and continuo, edited by Eberhard Hofmann (Ditzingen: Edition Musica Rinata, 2005)
 O wie ein so rauhe Krippen (Vilsbiburg: Musica pretiosa, 1996)
 Puellule decore, pastorella (Magdeburg: Edition Walhall, 2005)
 Litaneien op. 6 (1681)
 Marienvesper O benignissime Jesu'', motet (Strasbourg: Les Cahiers De Tourdion, 2001)

Recordings
 Vespers in Vienna. Pierre Cao
 Complete Motets Op. 5 4CD Daniela Dolci
 Celebremus Cum Gaudio Motets Op. 5 and Op. 1
 Triomphale Canticum Motets Op. 5 and Op. 1

References

External links

1626 births
1683 deaths
17th-century classical composers
Swiss classical composers
People from Bremgarten, Aargau